Vakkom is a area of Trivandrum Metropolitan Area near Kadakkavoor in Thiruvananthapuram district of Kerala, India. It is 35 km north of Thiruvananthapuram, the state capital. Vakkom panchayat is surrounded by back waters (Kayal). Neighbouring panchayats are Anjengo, Kadakkavoor, Vettoor, Cherunniyoor and Manampoor. The towns within 9 km are Varkala and Attingal. The nearest airport is Trivandrum International Airport and Kadakkavoor (1 km) is the nearest railway station.

The total area of Vakkom is 5.06 km2.

At the 2011 India census, Vakkom had a population of 19,267 with 8,319 males and 10,948 females.

Notable residents
 Vakkom Moulavi (1873 - 1932), Islamic renaissance leader, social reformer, Muslim scholar, Educationist and the founder of Swadeshabhimani newspaper.
 Vakkom Majeed (1909-2000), Indian freedom fighter, politician and a former member of the Travancore-Cochin State Assembly.
 Vakkom Abdul Khader (1917-1943), Indian freedom fighter and Indian National Army member who hanged by the British Government in 1943.
 Vakkom Purushothaman (1928-), Indian Politician, former governor of Mizoram and Andaman and Nicobar Islands.

References

Villages in Thiruvananthapuram district